Kivarz-e Sofla (also Romanized as Kīvarz-e Sofla; also known as Kīvarz-e Pā’īn) is a village in Borborud-e Gharbi Rural District, in the Central District of Aligudarz County, Lorestan Province, Iran. At the 2006 census, its population was 762, in 127 families.

References 

Towns and villages in Aligudarz County